Gillman is a surname. Notable people with the surname include:

Henry Gillman (1833–1915), American ethnologist
Herbert Webb Gillman (1832-1898), British/Ceylonese judge and historian
Leonard Gillman (1917–2009), American mathematician
Mariette Gillman, American slalom canoer
Neil Gillman (born 1933), American rabbi and philosopher
Peter Gillman (born 1942), British writer and journalist
Robert Gillman Allen Jackson (1911–1991), United Nations administrator
Sid Gillman (1911–2003), American football coach
Tricia Gillman (born 1951), British artist
Webb Gillman (1870–1933), British Army General during World War I